Lydia Welti Escher, (née Lydia Escher, 10 July 1858 in Zürich-Enge – 12 December 1891 in Genève-Champel) was a Swiss patron of the arts. Lydia Escher was one of the richest women in Switzerland in the 19th century, a patron of the arts who most notably established the Gottfried Keller Foundation.

Life

Origins and family 
Lydia Escher was born into the Escher vom Glas family, an old and influential Zürich family dynasty. She was the daughter of Augusta Escher-Uebel (1838–1864) and Alfred Escher (1819–1882), who, among many other business interests, was one of the founders of the Gotthardbahn. A scandal surrounding Alfred Escher's immediate forebears had, however, damaged her family line's reputation. Hans Caspar Escher-Werdmüller (1731–1781) had fathered a child out of wedlock with a maidservant in 1765 and emigrated. His son Hans Caspar Escher-Keller (1755–1831) almost brought Zürich to financial ruin when he went bankrupt. Finally Alfred Escher's father Heinrich Escher (1776–1853) made a new fortune through speculative land deals and trading in Northern America. In 1814 Heinrich returned to Zürich and married Lydia Zollikofer (1797–1868) in May 1815, having two children, Clementine (1816–1886) and Alfred. In 1857 Alfred Escher married Augusta Escher-Uebel (1838–1864): Lydia was born in 1858, but her sister Hedwig (1861–1862) died while still a baby. Lydia's suicide on 12 December 1891 brought the end to Alfred Escher's family line.

Childhood and youth 

Lydia Escher's grandfather Heinrich Escher had built the country house Belvoir on the left shore of Zürichsee in the then village of Enge, as of today a district of the city of Zürich, where Lydia grew up and lived. Heinrich Escher was able to devote himself fully to his passion for botany and his entomological collection, that also was cared for by her father, and by Lydia. At the age of four years, Lydia lost her younger sister, and Lydia's mother died in 1864. So that Alfred Escher was able to see his daughter several times a day, he rented for Lydia and her governess an apartment near his workplace in the city of Zürich. Since he was no longer married, Lydia was increasingly becoming also a close friend and started to support his work actively. Alfred Escher tried as often as possible to spend time with his daughter, and they maintained a cordial relationship.

Lydia Escher's youth differed substantially from those of other young women of Zürich of bourgeois origin: Lydia conducted her father's correspondence, ran the household in the Belvoir estate, and she grew into the role of the hostess and entertainer of the numerous guests of Alfred Escher, among them the Swiss poet Gottfried Keller who was also a fatherly friend. Lydia Escher was a self-confident young woman, who read extensively, mastered several languages and gladly attended music and theatre performances. In her letters to her childhood friend, the painter Louise Breslau, she told her to take singing and piano lessons, and Lydia was inspired by her creative genius.

In addition to personal attacks from political opponents, Lydia's father faced serious health problems. He suffered repeated bouts of ill health throughout his life and on many occasions was obliged to spend long periods in convalescence. During the critical phase of the Gotthard Rail Tunnel construction in the mid-1870s, Escher nearly worked himself to death. In 1878 he fell so badly ill that he was unable to leave Belvoir for weeks. His life followed a constant pattern of illness and recovery. However, in fulfilling his political and business obligations, in late November 1882 Alfred Escher fell badly ill again, and in the morning of 6 December 1882 Alfred Escher died on his Belvoir estate. Throughout, Escher has been lovingly cared for by his daughter, and she was regarded as his only confidante, who oversaw much of his correspondence and accompanied her father on his many travels.

Marriage with Friedrich Emil Welti 
Because the relationship between Alfred Escher and his former protege Emil Welti had deteriorated before, Escher was against Lydia's engagement with Welti's son Friedrich Emil. Since the engagement had already been published, Lydia married after her father's death on 4 January 1883. Friedrich Emil Welti was the son of the Swiss Federal Councillor (Bundesrat) Emil Welti, one of the then most powerful people in Switzerland, and former companion and later opponent of Lydia's father. Welti rose in the Swiss economic circles thanks to his marriage with Lydia and sat on numerous boards of directors. Meanwhile, Lydia Welti-Escher rapidly became bored, not being fulfilled by the management of Welti's comparatively modest household, and was missing interesting guests and stimulating conversations as she had known in her father's household. Through her husband, she finally came into contact with his childhood friend Karl Stauffer-Bern, a known Swiss painter, in August 1885, and henceforth Stauffer was on occasion of his travels to Zürich a guest at the Belvoir mansion. In his own atelier in the spacious park area, Stauffer portrayed Lydia Escher, but also Lydia's fatherly friend Gottfried Keller. Lydia and Emil Welti-Escher enabled Stauffer to work in Rome. In October 1889 Lydia and her husband moved to Florence, but shortly after, Friedrich Emil Welti went  back to Switzerland for financial reasons, and left his wife in care of Karl Stauffer.

Liaison with Karl Stauffer-Bern 
Lydia and Stauffer fell in love, and Lydia told to Stauffer's mother to marry him. In 1888, still under the sponsorship of his patrons, the Welti-Escher family, Karl Stauffer-Bern went to Rome to study sculpture. While there, the liaison of Lydia Welti-Escher with him became public knowledge, the Welti family was outraged, and Lydia and Karl escaped to Rome. Even the divorce from her husband was proposed, but Welti contacted the Swiss Embassy in Rome and used his considerable influence to separate them. Lydia was placed in a public insane asylum in Rome, and Stauffer-Bern was jailed after being charged with kidnapping and rape. While staying there, Lydia posted the feminist (emancipatory) publication Gedanken einer Frau (literally: Thoughts of a woman) and planned to publish it. The document is still disappeared, as well as the majority of Lydia Escher's comprehensive correspondency was probably destroyed during this time. It is significant that still an important part of the Welti family archives is not accessible to researchers and historians.

In May 1890, a full psychiatric report showed no sign of mental illness and Lydia Welti-Escher was released. She returned to her husband, although she soon filed for a divorce, which was eventually granted. In a state of despondency over the loss of his love, Karl Stauffer-Bern suffered a nervous breakdown, spent some time in the San Bonifazio mental hospital, and after his release, he attempted suicide by gun. In January 1891, unable to work and apparently suffering from persecution mania, he committed suicide.

Stigmatization and suicide 

After four months of internment in the public psychiatric hospital in Rome, Lydia Escher was finally brought back by her husband to Switzerland. She approved his wish for a divorce and a financial agreement, which committed Lydia to a payment of 1.2 million Swiss Francs 'compensation' to Welti. In the 'high society' of Zürich, Lydia was no longer accepted, and she was ostracized as an adulteress. Therefore, she moved into a house in Genève-Champel in the late summer of 1890. There Lydia Escher finished her last goal in life, the establishment of an Arts foundation, later named Gottfried Keller Stiftung, which she devoted to her fatherly friend from her youth. Lydia Welti-Escher decided to end her life on 12 December 1891; she opened the gas tap in her villa near Geneva.

It was controversial discussed, whether according to Josef Jung's biography, Lydia had been examined after her detention in the psychiatric clinic in Rome, and upon returning to Switzerland (again) in the clinic of Königsfelden, if she resided there. The biographerly Willi Wottreng claimed, for a further stay in Königsfelden, there are no sources; This is important, because it shows that Lydia Welti-Escher had resisted the will of her husband and father-in-law, thus demonstrating to be an emancipated woman after the events in Italy. The recently published psychiatric report about Lydia Escher, dated 27 May 1890, showed that her internment in the clinicum in Roma and the diagnosis of systematic madness was fictitious. Also from today's perspective, the argument way of the reviewers and their conclusion, that Lydia Escher was in possession of their full mental health, convinced.

Selected portraits

Gottfried Keller Foundation 
In 1890, shortly before the end of her tragic life, Lydia Escher invested the Escher family's fortune in a foundation, which she called the Gottfried Keller-Stiftung (GKS), named after Gottfried Keller to whom her father gave consistent support. With her remaining substantial asset – Villa Belvoir and marketable securities totaling nominally 4 million Swiss Francs – Lydia Escher established the foundation's base. According to the will of Lydia Escher, the foundation was established on 6 June 1890, and was managed by the Swiss Federal Council, thus, Lydia Escher wished to accomplish a patriotic work. The foundation should also promote the independent work of women, at least in the field of the applied of Arts, according to the original intention of the founder. This purpose was adopted – but at the urging of Welti not in the deed of the foundation. The Gottfried Keller Foundation became though an important collection institution for art, but the feminist concerns of Lydia Escher but was not met.

Aftermath and monuments 

The Gottfried Keller foundation, as of today is based in Winterthur, and it is listed as a Swiss inventory of cultural property of national and regional significance.

Lydia Escher is considered an outstanding woman of the Belle Époque in Switzerland, she blew up close social and moral standards of existence by their liaison with an artist, to which she open stood; and, on the other hand, Lydia Escher's historic achievement is in the creation of a Swiss art foundation of national importance. Lydia Escher, as a prominent patron of the arts, was honored by the Gesellschaft zu Fraumünster association on the occasion of her 150th anniversary by a commemorative plaque, located at a spot in front of the Kunsthaus Zürich. 

The place was baptized on 20 August 2008 by the city of Zürich as Lydia Welti-Escher Hof.

In television and theater 
 2014: Die letzten Stunden der Lydia Welti-Escher. Play after Christine Ahlborn.
 2013: Die Schweizer: Kampf um den Gotthard – Alfred Escher und Stefano Franscini. Television documentary play produced by Schweizer Radio und Fernsehen (SRF)

Literature 
 Willi Wottreng: Lydia Welti-Escher. Eine Frau in der Belle Epoque. Elster-Verlag, Zürich 2014, .
 Joseph Jung: Lydia Welti-Escher (1858–1891). Mit einer Einführung von Hildegard Elisabeth Keller. NZZ Libro, Zürich 2013, .
 Joseph Jung: Lydia Welti-Escher (1858–1891). Biographie. Quellen, Materialien und Beiträge. NZZ Libro, Zürich 2009, .
 Willi Wottreng: Die Millionärin und der Maler: Die Tragödie Lydia Welti-Escher und Karl Stauffer-Bern. Orell Füssli, Zürich 2008, .
 Hanspeter Landolt: Gottfried Keller-Stiftung. Sammeln für die Schweizer Museen. 1890–1990. 100 Jahre Gottfried Keller-Stiftung. Benteli, Bern 1990, .
 Bernhard von Arx: Der Fall Stauffer. Chronik eines Skandals. Hallwag, Bern 1969, .
 Lukas Hartmann: Ein Bild von Lydia. Diogenes, Zürich 2018, .
 Hildegard Elisabeth Keller: ''Lydias Fest. Edition Maulhelden, Zürich 2019, .

References

External links 

 
 
 Gottfried Keller Stiftung, Bundesamt für Kultur 
 Lydia Welti-Escher on the website of the Swiss Archives (Bundesarchiv) 
 
 Digital edition of Alfred Escher's correspondence  
 Lydia Escher on the website of the Swiss television SRF 

1858 births
1891 deaths
People from Zürich
Swiss philanthropists
19th-century Swiss people
19th-century Swiss women
Swiss feminists
19th-century philanthropists
1890s suicides
Patrons of the visual arts